Mount Tripyramid may refer to:

 Mount Tripyramid (Alaska)
 Mount Tripyramid (New Hampshire)